The 2013–14 Washington State Cougars men's basketball team represented Washington State University during the 2013–14 NCAA Division I men's basketball season. The Cougars led by, 5th year head coach Ken Bone, they played their games at the Beasley Coliseum and were members of the Pac-12 Conference. They finished with a record of 10–21 overall, 3–15 in Pac-12 play to finish in eleventh place. They lost in the first round of the 2014 Pac-12 Conference men's basketball tournament to Stanford. On March 18, 2014 it was announced that Ken Bone was fired after 5 seasons with Washington State.

Departures

Recruits

Roster

Schedule

|-
!colspan=9| Exhibition

|-
!colspan=9| Regular season

|-
!colspan=9| Pac-12 Conference tournament

References

Washington State Cougars
Washington State Cougars men's basketball seasons
Washington State
Washington State